Andamia expansa is a species of combtooth blenny which is known from a few specimens from the eastern Indian Ocean, with the type being collected in the Andaman Islands. The IUCN rate it as Data Deficient because its taxonomy is unclear. It forms pairs and lays adhesive eggs on the substrates.

References

expansa
Fish described in 1858